Ahmad Ammar bin Ahmad Azam (15 February 1993 – 2 November 2013) was a moderate Islamic activist in Malaysia and Turkey. Ahmad Ammar was the son of former Fifth President of Islamic Youth Movement of Malaysia (ABIM), Ahmad Azam Abdul Rahman and Nur Azlina Aziz,

Education 

He started his primary education at al-Huda Islamic Elementary School, Gombak before attending Bestari Islamic Middle School, Subang Jaya, in 2006. In 2009, he attended Royal Military College and was commissioned as a Junior Under Officer. In 2010, he scored 9 As in Malaysian Certificate of Education (SPM) and was named the second best student there.

Following his parents' planning, he furthered his studies in Turkey. In 2011, he attended a preparatory programme at Ankara University before attending Marmara University, studying history, in the following year.

Activities

Voluntary activities 

During his studies, he was made a correspondent of World Civilization Finder Group (GPTD) in Turkey. More than that, he involved actively in many community service programmes in various countries, including Cambodia and Indonesia. These including contributions to Rohingya refugees in Malaysia under the support of his beloved mother who is actively involved in humanitarian-based non-governmental organization (NGO) namely Future Global Network and Global Peace Mission Malaysia.

Hayrat Foundation 

His activities with Hayrat Foundation began exactly just after he graduated from his secondary school education. In order to further his studies at Turkey, he stayed with the organization's delegates in Malaysia at the Madrasah Hayrat in order to master Turkish language. While staying with them, he studied the basic of Risale-i Nur in the Turkish language. After mastering the language, his parents sent him to Turkey and he stayed with the Hayrat Foundation.

In 8 months, he managed to end his study over Risale-i Nur and was certified by the foundation. There were also traces of him re-wrote Risale-i Nur in the Ottoman Turkish language using his own writing together with his friends' assistance.

Death 

On 2 November 2013 around 1.30 pm, after getting the credential to teach Said Nursî's Risalah an-Nur from Hayrat Foundation, he was expected to teach it to his students in Istanbul.  Ammar was hit by an ambulance whilst crossing a road and died at the scene.

On the following day, he was being prayed at Eyüp Sultan Mosque and was buried in Eyüp Cemetery in honour of him and on his father's request. He is the first foreigner to be honoured by Turkey to be buried there.

News of his death and his story was widespread in some countries including Malaysia, Turkey and Cambodia. Thousands of peoples send their condolences to his family, including Minister of Foreign Affairs of Turkey, Ahmet Davutoğlu.

Awards 

To commemorate his service towards moderate Islam in Malaysia and Turkey, he was conferred 2 awards in conjunction with Maulidur Rasul 1435 celebration. King Abdul Halim awarded him National Maulidur Rasul Award, while Sultan Sharafuddin of Selangor awarded him Saidina Ali Special Award.

References

External links 
 Facebook page "Şehıdımız Ahmad Ammar"
 

Malaysian Muslims
1993 births
2013 deaths
Road incident deaths in Turkey
Pedestrian road incident deaths
People from Kuala Lumpur
Malaysian activists
Marmara University alumni
Burials at Eyüp Cemetery